Sohail Ahmed (born 1 January 1979) is a Pakistani boxer. He competed in the men's featherweight event at the 2004 Summer Olympics.

References

External links

1979 births
Living people
Pakistani male boxers
Olympic boxers of Pakistan
Boxers at the 2004 Summer Olympics
Place of birth missing (living people)
Featherweight boxers